Lewis Reeves is an English actor. He is known for his roles as Jake in the comedy horror series Crazyhead, as Gareth Walker in the video games FIFA 17 and FIFA 18, and as Eric in the Donmar production of My Night with Reg by Kevin Elyot.

Filmography

Film

Television

Theatre

Video games

References

External links
 

1988 births
21st-century English male actors
Actors from Doncaster
English male film actors
English male stage actors
English male television actors
Living people